The Adran Premier, currently known as genero Adran Premier (for sponsorship reasons), is the highest level of league competition for women's football in Wales. It is the women's equivalent of the men's Cymru Premier, and it is organized by the Football Association of Wales. As of 2022, the league is ranked 41st overall by the UEFA Women's association club coefficients.

History
In its first three seasons, the league was divided into two Conferences that played a double round robin, with the winner of both contesting a final for the championship. The first season featured no relegation, from the 2010–11 season onwards, the last placed team in each conference got relegated.

Since 2012–13 the league is played in one group only. In 2015–16 two teams were relegated.
The eight clubs who formed the League were Aberystwyth Town Ladies, Caernarfon Town Ladies, Llanidloes Ladies, Manorbier Ladies, Newcastle Emlyn Ladies, Swansea City Ladies, UWIC Ladies and Wrexham Ladies.

The league was increased to five teams per Conference in 2010–11, with Caerphilly Castle Ladies and Trefelin Ladies joining the South and Llandudno Junction Ladies joining the North. Manorbier Ladies ceased playing activities after their inaugural season.

Llandudno Junction's stay in the league lasted just one season before they were relegated; they were replaced by Northop Hall Girls.

In its first three years the league was divided into two conferences, north and south. Both winners then played a championship play-off for the title and right to play in the UEFA Women's Champions League. A relegation system was introduced in the second season, when the last place in each conference was relegated. The league changed the format to a single division for the 2012–13 season. The league was also expanded for the second time. The number of teams in the league has fluctuated in preceding years and has contained eight, ten and twelve teams in various seasons.

In May 2021, the Football Association of Wales announced a restructuring of the league, including cutting the number of teams from nine to eight, the splitting the second tier into northern and southern conferences, and the introduction of a U19 development league. The restructuring would see Abergavenny Women's FC, Caerphilly's Cascade Ladies YC and Briton Ferry Llansawel Ladies demoted to the second tier and Barry Town United Ladies FC and The New Saints joining the Premier League. The choice of top-tier teams in the restructuring was met with a significant amount of criticism, especially as Abergavenny had finished within the top four during the 2020–21 season and The New Saints did not have a complete senior women's side. FAW head of women's football Lowri Roberts stated that the Association would not be reversing their decision, adding that "we have to be able to compete with Tier 3 in England. The WSL and Championship in England are professional and semi-professional and we’re a long way off that. It’s unlikely we’ll get to a professional level."

In August 2021, the league announced a rebranding initiative, changing the name from "Welsh Premier Women's League" to "Adran Premier", adopting the Welsh word adran (division). For sponsorship reasons it is named the "Genero Adran Premier" (sponsored by Welsh firm Genero). The rebranding is claimed as an effort to remove the word "Women's" from the league name to achieve better parity with the men's game.

Competition format
The club with the highest number of points at the end of the season will be the League Champions. In the event of two or more clubs having the same number of points the League winners will be decided by the difference between goals scored and goals against. In the event of more than one club having the same goal difference, the club that has scored the highest number of goals will be the Champions.

Promotion and relegation
One club may be promoted to the Adran Premier and the equivalent number relegated from the competition. One from the Adran North or one from the Adran South. To determine the club to be promoted from the Adran North or Adran South - the qualified clubs from the two leagues concerned will play off.

European qualification

UEFA grants European places to the Football Association of Wales, determined by Wales' position in the UEFA country coefficient rankings. The Welsh Football Association in turn allocate a number of these European places to the final Welsh Premier Women's League positions. As of 2023, Wales was ranked 40th in Europe – granting them one placement in the UEFA Women's Champions League qualifying rounds.

Clubs

2022–23

List of champions
In the first three seasons, a final between the north and south division winners determined the champion.

Adran Trophy
The Premier League Cup (now Adran Trophy) has been held since 2014.

Winners:

2014: Cardiff Met. Ladies F.C.
2015: PILCS
2016: Swansea City Ladies F.C.
2017: Cardiff Met. Ladies
2018: Cyncoed Ladies F.C.
 2019: Cardiff Met. Ladies
 2020: Final cancelled
 2021: Swansea City Ladies
 2022: Cardiff Met. Ladies

See also 

 Women's football in Wales

References

External links

League at uefa.com

 
Top level women's association football leagues in Europe
Women's football in Wales
Women's football leagues in the United Kingdom